Midway Arcade Treasures: Extended Play is a  video game compilation of 21 classic Midway, Atari and Williams arcade games released in 2005 for the PlayStation Portable. Midway Arcade Treasures: Extended Play was re-released for the PlayStation Store on June 28, 2010 by Warner Bros. Interactive Entertainment due to Midway's bankruptcy, also meaning that Warner Bros. owns rights to most of the Midway, Atari and Williams arcade library after the purchase of some assets of Midway Games.

Games included
 720°
 Arch Rivals
 Championship Sprint
 Cyberball 2072
 Defender
 Gauntlet
 Joust
 Klax
 Marble Madness 
 Mortal Kombat
 Mortal Kombat 2
 Mortal Kombat 3
 Paperboy
 Rampage
 Rampart
 Sinistar
 Spy Hunter
 Toobin'
 Wizard of Wor
 Xenophobe
 Xybots

Reception

Midway Arcade Treasures: Extended Play was given mixed reviews from game critics. On the review aggregator Game Rankings, the game has an average score of 62%, based on 35 reviews. On Metacritic, the game has an average score of 63 out of 100, based on 24 reviews.
The collection has been criticized for lacking bonus content, for its "bare-bones" presentation, lengthy load times, and for making some games look "stretched", (like Paperboy), or "shrunk", (like Sinistar), although one can press the L trigger and hit the Square button when a game is paused to enable a secret functionality  that displays the games in their original aspect ratio.

References

External links
Midway Arcade Treasures 2: Extended Play media and information archive at Total Mortal Kombat
Midway Arcade Treasures: Extended Play at IGN

PlayStation Portable games
PlayStation Portable-only games
2005 video games
Midway video game compilations
Video games developed in the United States

fr:Midway Arcade Treasures#Midway Arcade Treasures: Extended Play